Mangelia gazellae is a species of sea snail, a marine gastropod mollusk in the family Mangeliidae.

Description
The length of the shell varies between 10 mm and 22.5 mm.

Distribution
This marine species occurs off Argentina and Tierra del Fuego.

References

  Strebel, Beiträge zur Kenntnis der Molluskenfauna der  Magalhaen-Provinz; Jena,Gustav Fischer,1904–1907

External links
  Tucker, J.K. 2004 Catalog of recent and fossil turrids (Mollusca: Gastropoda). Zootaxa 682:1–1295.
 

gazellae
Gastropods described in 1905